Love Like This may refer to:

Albums
 Love Like This (Ayiesha Woods album), 2008
 Love Like This (Collabro album), 2019
 Love Like This (The Summer Set album), 2009

Songs
 "Love Like This" (Donell Jones song), 2010 
 "Love Like This" (Faith Evans song), 1998
 "Love Like This" (Kodaline song), 2012
 "Love Like This" (Natalie Bassingthwaighte song), 2010
 "Love Like This" (Natasha Bedingfield song), 2007, featuring Sean Kingston
 "Love Like This (Eternity)", a song by Jay Sean

Other uses
A Love Like This, a 2016 romantic drama directed by Chandran Rutnam